Emma Webster may refer to:
 Emma Webster, better known as Granny (Looney Tunes), a Warner Bros. Cartoons character
 Emma Webster (artist), British-American painter